Lake Kizi ( or Большое Кизи) is a large freshwater lake in Khabarovsk Krai, Russia. It lies near the right bank of the Amur River to which it is connected by the series of canals, and close to the Tatar Strait. Kizi is used for fishery.

References

Kizi